Jerry Adriano Moreno Pires (born on the 10th of january ,1988 in Cape Verde) is a Cape Verdean football player who is currently playing as a striker for El-Gawafel Sportives de Gafsa in the Tunisian Ligue Professionnelle 1.

In September 2008, Adriano joined Orlando Pirates from USM Alger.

Club career
 2003-2007 US Monastir 
 2007-2008 Espérance de Tunis 
 2008-2008 USM Alger 
 2008-2009 Orlando Pirates 
 2011–2012 EGS Gafsa 
2012-2013 AS Gabes
2013-2014 US Monastir
2013-2014-AL Naser Zliten

References

1988 births
Cape Verdean footballers
Cape Verdean expatriate footballers
Living people
USM Alger players
Association football forwards
Orlando Pirates F.C. players
Expatriate soccer players in South Africa
US Monastir (football) players
Expatriate footballers in Algeria
Expatriate footballers in Tunisia
Espérance Sportive de Tunis players
AS Gabès players
EGS Gafsa players